Barracuda is an Australian drama miniseries, first broadcast on ABC TV starting 10 July 2016. The series is based on Barracuda, the 2013 novel by Australian author Christos Tsiolkas, which explores a brutal clash of cultures, dreams and expectations and the relentless demands that are placed upon young athletes, their families, friends, schools and coaches.

Barracuda is written by Blake Ayshford and Belinda Chayko and directed by Robert Connolly. It is produced by Tony Ayres and Amanda Higgs with Christos Tsiolkas as associate producer. The series is a Matchbox Pictures production in association with ABC Television, Screen Australia and Film Victoria.

Synopsis
Set from 1996, Danny Kelly is a talented swimmer who attends a prestigious Melbourne private school on a sporting scholarship. Working class, half Greek and half Irish, he is the target of harassment from the privileged students. Danny yearns to win swimming gold at the 2000 Sydney Olympic Games. He is taken under the wing of highly regarded coach Frank Torma and develops a friendship/rivalry with teammate Martin Taylor which inspires Danny to become a world record holder.

Cast
 Elias Anton as Danny Kelly
 Ben Kindon as Martin Taylor
 Matt Nable as Frank Torma
 Rachel Griffiths as Samantha Taylor
 Jeremy Lindsay Taylor as Neal Kelly
 Victoria Haralabidou as Stephanie Kelly
 Tilda Cobham-Hervey as Emma Taylor
 Andrew Creer as Wilco
 Jacob Collins-Levy as Clyde
 Joel Lok as Luke Tran
 Rhys Mitchell as Scooter
 Imran Adams as Theo Kelly
 Luca Sardelis as Regan Kelly
 Joe Klocek as Tsitsas
 Damon Gameau as Ben Whitter
 Helen Morse as Margot

Episodes

Note

Broadcast
Internationally, the series was acquired in the United Kingdom by BBC Three, in South Africa by Dstv and Skai TV in Greece.

References

External links

Official site

Australian Broadcasting Corporation original programming
2016 Australian television series debuts
2016 Australian television series endings
Television shows set in Melbourne
English-language television shows
Television series about teenagers
Television series by Matchbox Pictures
Television series set in 1996